Zandanbudyn Zanabazar is a Mongolian freestyle wrestler. He won one of the bronze medals in the men's 57kg event at the 2022 World Wrestling Championships held in Belgrade, Serbia. He won the silver medal in his event at the 2017 Asian Wrestling Championships held in New Delhi, India.

He also competed at the 2021 Asian Wrestling Championships, the 2022 Yasar Dogu Tournament and the 2022 Asian Wrestling Championships.

Achievements

References

External links
 

Living people
1996 births
People from Ömnögovi Province
Mongolian male sport wrestlers
World Wrestling Championships medalists
Asian Wrestling Championships medalists
21st-century Mongolian people